Calliphysalis carpenteri, or Carpenter's groundcherry, is a perennial plant in the family Solanaceae, the "nightshade" plants.  Native to sandy soils on the coastal plain regions of southeastern North America from northern Florida to Louisiana and Arkansas, it was first described from specimens collected in West Feliciana Parish, Louisiana.  Its species name honors the botanical contributions of early Louisiana naturalist William Marbury Carpenter (1811-1848).

Uses
The Plants for a Future project notes that Calliphysalis carpenteri belongs to a genus which includes members with poisonous leaves and stems, although the fully ripe fruits are usually edible, and give it an Edibility Rating of 2 out of 5, with no medicinal value or other uses noted.

Taxonomic history
Prior to 2012, this species was known as Physalis carpenteri. At that time it was placed in a new, monotypic genus, Calliphysalis, based on chromosomal, molecular, morphological, and phylogenetic data that demonstrated its uniqueness.

Among species in Physalis and related genera, Carpenter's groundcherry is believed to be most closely related to Alkekengi officinarum (formerly Physalis alkekengi).

References

Plants described in 1896